is a passenger railway station in located in the town of Kushimoto, Higashimuro District, Wakayama Prefecture, Japan, operated by West Japan Railway Company (JR West).

Lines

Station layout
The station consists of one side platform serving a single bi-directional track. The station is unattended.

Adjacent stations

|-
!colspan=5|West Japan Railway Company (JR West)

History
Tako Station opened on November 15, 1954. With the privatization of the Japan National Railways (JNR) on April 1, 1987, the station came under the aegis of the West Japan Railway Company.

Passenger statistics
In fiscal 2019, the station was used by an average of 5 passengers daily (boarding passengers only).

Surrounding Area

See also
List of railway stations in Japan

References

External links

 Tanami Station (West Japan Railway) 

Railway stations in Wakayama Prefecture
Railway stations in Japan opened in 1954
Kushimoto, Wakayama